Wang Sheng (2nd-century), was a Chinese court official.

She was the wet nurse of Emperor An of Han, and had an influential position in the palace and imperial court during the reign of emperor An, and was involved in several plots.

References 

2nd-century Chinese women
2nd-century Chinese people
Chinese courtiers